Georgios Vasiliadis (born 10 June 1996) is a Greek professional footballer who plays as a goalkeeper for Super League 2 club Apollon Larissa.

References

1996 births
Living people
Greek footballers
Greece youth international footballers
Super League Greece players
Super League Greece 2 players
Football League (Greece) players
Veria F.C. players
Ergotelis F.C. players
Doxa Drama F.C. players
Platanias F.C. players
Apollon Larissa F.C. players
Association football goalkeepers
Footballers from Thessaloniki